The Korea Automobile Importers & Distributors Association (Korean: 한국수입자동차협회), or KAIDA, is a South Korean trade association representing importers and distributors of imported automobiles, established in 1995. It is a corporation registered under the Ministry of Commerce, Industry and Energy, whose membership consists of thirteen importers and distributors of foreign automotive marques in the South Korean market.

KAIDA lobbies in support of its members for government deregulation of the South Korean import auto market, and also helps manage and coordinate joint events for sales promotions and other activities for automobile importers and distributors.

History
1994: General Assembly establishes KAIDA
1995: 
KAIDA is licensed as a Corporation by the Ministry of Commerce, Industry and Energy
Inauguration of Sang-Do Kang, 1st Chairman of KAIDA
1997:
Vote for full-time working structure at the Regular General Assembly (Opening of full-time working organizations and corporate offices of KAIDA)
Inauguration of Byung-Gun Choi, 2nd Chairman of KAIDA
Press meeting on 10th anniversary of the automobile imports and open markets
Joint press conference with AAMA, ACEA and KAIDA
1998: Joint marketing campaigns in opposition to protests against imported automobiles
1999: KAIDA website opens
2000:
1st survey of Consumer Attitude Towards Import Cars In Korea
Inauguration of Eul-Rae Son, 3rd Chairman of KAIDA
Guide Book for Imported Automobiles published
KAIDA hosts "2000 Korea Import Motor Show"  
2001: 2nd survey of Consumer Attitude Towards Import Cars In Korea
2002:
Inauguration of Eul-Rae Son, 4th Chairman of KAIDA
3rd survey of Consumer Attitude Towards Import Cars In Korea 
Influence of imported automobiles elucidated by the KIEP & Economy Strategy Institute on Domestic Automobile Industry
Internet data programs on the registration and statistics of imported automobiles
2003:
4th survey of Consumer Attitude Towards Import Cars In Korea
Guide Book for Imported Automobiles published
KAIDA hosts "2003 Korea Import Motor Show"
2004:
5th survey of Consumer Attitude Towards Import Cars In Korea
Inauguration of Seung-Chul Song, 5th Chairman of KAIDA
2005:
6th survey of Consumer Attitude Towards Import Cars In Korea
Guide Book for Imported Automobiles published
KAIDA co-hosts "2005 Seoul Motor Show"
2017:
Started compiling statistics on new imported commercial vehicle registrations

Corporate members of KAIDA

Passenger vehicle importers and distributors 
 Audi Volkswagen Korea Ltd. (Audi, Bentley, Lamborghini, Volkswagen)
 BMW Group Korea (BMW, MINI, Rolls-Royce)
 Cadillac Korea (Cadillac)
 Ford Sales & Service Korea (Ford, Lincoln)
 Forza Motors Korea (Maserati)
 GM Korea (Chevrolet, GMC)
 Honda Korea (Honda)
 Jaguar Land Rover Korea (Jaguar, Land Rover)
 Mercedes-Benz Korea (Mercedes-Benz)
 Polestar Korea (Polestar)
 Porsche Korea (Porsche)
 Stellantis Korea (DS, Jeep, Peugeot)
 Toyota Motor Korea (Lexus, Toyota)
 Volvo Car Korea (Volvo)

Commercial vehicle importers and distributors 
 CNH Industrial Korea (Iveco)
 Daimler Trucks Korea (Mercedes-Benz)
 MAN Truck & Bus Korea (MAN)
 Scania Korea Seoul (Scania)
 Volvo Trucks Korea (Volvo)

See also
Automotive industry in South Korea
Economy of South Korea

External links
KAIDA website

Motor trade associations
Automotive industry in South Korea
Trade associations based in South Korea